Auxilium High School is an international school ran by convent of Salesian Sisters of Don Bosco, daughters of Our Lady help of Christians.
It is located in the Secunderabad area, near East Marredpally, Mahendra Hills, Trimurti Colony, in Hyderabad, Ranga Reddy district, Telangana state, India.
It is a co-education school, with grades from lower kindergarten to grade ten, and teaches according to the SSC curriculum.

Extra-curricular activities
The school provides many extra-curricular activities for students. Popular outdoor activities include basketball, football, cricket, and volleyball.
Indoor activities include debate, chess, art classes, singing/dancing classes, and others. 

Schools in Hyderabad, India
Educational institutions in India with year of establishment missing